Hou Fengqi (born March 1962) is a former Chinese politician who spent most of his career in the cities of Bayannur and Wuhai, in north China's Inner Mongolia. He was investigated by the Communist Party of China's anti-graft agency in November 2015. Previously he served as Communist Party Secretary of Wuhai. In October 2017, he was sentenced to 17 years for accepting bribes and holding a huge amount of property from an unidentified source.

Career
Born in March 1962, he studied and then worked as Secretary of Youth League Branch at Baotou Junior Normal College. From August 1983 to September 1989 he worked in the 208 geological prospecting brigade of Baotou Nuclear Industry. In September 1989 he was accepted to Huazhong University of Science and Technology and graduated in July 1991. After graduation, he was assigned to  the Propaganda Department of CPC Inner Mongolia Committee, where he worked there until June 1996. In June 1996 he was vice-mayor of Linhe, two years later he was promoted to become deputy secretary-general of Bayannur. He was a member of the CPC Bayannur Standing Committee and Communist Party Secretary of Linhe District from July 2004 to November 2006. Then he was promoted to become executive vice-mayor, a position he held until February 2008, when he was transferred to Wuhai and appointed Deputy Communist Party Secretary. In May 2013 he became the Communist Party Secretary, and served until November 2015.

Downfall
On November 20, 2015, he was suspected of "serious violations of discipline", said one-sentence statement issued by the ruling Communist Party's corruption watchdog body, the Central Commission for Discipline Inspection (CCDI). On November 26, he was removed from his posts for involvement in corruption. 

In October 2017, he was sentenced to 17 years for accepting bribes and holding a huge amount of property from an unidentified source. Hou's wife Yang Xiu'e was also sentenced to 3 years. And his superior Bai Xiangqun was put under investigation in April 2018.

References

1962 births
Huazhong University of Science and Technology alumni
Living people
People's Republic of China politicians from Inner Mongolia
Chinese Communist Party politicians from Inner Mongolia